The 1917–18 Indiana Hoosiers men's basketball team represented Indiana University. Their head coach was Dana Evans, who was in his 1st year. The team played its home games at the Men's Gymnasium in Bloomington, Indiana, and was a member of the Big Ten Conference.

The Hoosiers finished the regular season with an overall record of 10–4 and a conference record of 3–3, finishing 8th in the Big Ten Conference.

Roster

Schedule/Results

|-
!colspan=8| Regular Season
|-

References

Indiana
Indiana Hoosiers men's basketball seasons
Indiana Hoosiers
Indiana Hoosiers